Aelia Capitolina was a Roman colony founded during Emperor Hadrian's trip to Judaea in 129/130 CE, centered around Jerusalem, which had been almost totally razed after the siege of 70 CE. The foundation of Aelia Capitolina and the construction of a temple to Jupiter at the site of the former temple may have been one of the causes for the outbreak of the Bar Kokhba revolt in 132. Aelia Capitolina remained as the official name until Late Antiquity and the Aelia part of the name transliterated to Īlyāʾ was also used by the Umayyad Caliphate.

Name
Aelia came from Hadrian's nomen gentile, Aelius, while Capitolina meant that the new city was dedicated to Jupiter Capitolinus, to whom a temple was built. The Latin name Aelia is the source of the much later Arabic term Īlyāʾ (إيلياء), a 7th-century Islamic name for Jerusalem.

History

Jerusalem, once heavily rebuilt by Herod, was still in ruins following the decisive siege of the city, as part of the First Jewish–Roman War in AD 70.

According to Eusebius, the Jerusalem church was scattered twice, in 70 and 135, with the difference that from 70 to 130 the bishops of Jerusalem have evidently Jewish names, whereas after 135 the bishops of Aelia Capitolina appear to be Greeks. Eusebius' evidence for continuation of a church at Aelia Capitolina is confirmed by the Bordeaux Pilgrim.

The Roman emperor Hadrian decided to rebuild the city as a Roman colony, which would be inhabited by his legionaries. Hadrian's new city was to be dedicated to himself and certain Roman gods, in particular Jupiter.

There is controversy as to whether Hadrian's anti-Jewish decrees followed the Jewish Bar Kokhba revolt or preceded it and were the cause of the revolt. The older view is that the Bar Kokhba revolt, which took the Romans three years to suppress, enraged Hadrian, and he became determined to erase Judaism from the province. Circumcision was forbidden and Jews were expelled from the city. Hadrian renamed Iudaea Province to Syria Palaestina, dispensing with the name of Judaea.

Jerusalem was renamed "Aelia Capitolina" and rebuilt in the style of its original Hippodamian plan although adapted to Roman use. Jews were prohibited from entering the city on pain of death, except for one day each year, during the fast day of Tisha B'Av. Taken together, these measures (which also affected Jewish Christians) essentially secularized the city. The ban was maintained until the 7th century, though Christians would soon be granted an exemption: during the 4th century, the Roman emperor Constantine I ordered the construction of Christian holy sites in the city, including the Church of the Holy Sepulchre. Burial remains from the Byzantine period are exclusively Christian, suggesting that the population of Jerusalem in Byzantine times probably consisted only of Christians.

In the fifth century, the eastern continuation of the Roman Empire that was ruled from Constantinople, maintained control of the city. At the beginning of the seventh century, within the span of a few decades, the city shifted from Byzantine to Persian rule, then back to Roman-Byzantine dominion. Following Sassanid Khosrau II's early seventh century push through Syria, his generals Shahrbaraz and Shahin attacked Jerusalem aided by the Jews of Palaestina Prima, who had risen up against the Byzantines. In the Siege of Jerusalem of 614 AD, after 21 days of relentless siege warfare, Jerusalem was captured. Byzantine chronicles relate that the Sassanids and Jews slaughtered tens of thousands of Christians in the city, many at the Mamilla Pool, and destroyed their monuments and churches, including the Church of the Holy Sepulchre. The conquered city would remain in Sassanid hands for some fifteen years until the Byzantine emperor Heraclius reconquered it in 629.

Byzantine Jerusalem was conquered by the Arab armies of Umar ibn al-Khattab in AD 638, which resulted in the removal of the restrictions on Jews living in the city. Among Muslims of Islam's earliest era it was referred to as Madinat bayt al-Maqdis, 'City of the Temple', a name restricted to the Temple Mount. The rest of the city was called "Iliya", reflecting the Roman name Aelia Capitolina.

Plan of the city

The city was without walls, protected by a light garrison of the Tenth Legion, during the Late Roman period. The detachment at Jerusalem, which apparently encamped all over the city's western hill, was responsible for preventing Jews from returning to the city. Roman enforcement of this prohibition continued through the 4th century.

Layout and street pattern
The urban plan of Aelia Capitolina was that of a typical Roman town wherein main thoroughfares crisscrossed the urban grid lengthwise and widthwise. The urban grid was based on the usual central north–south road (cardo maximus) and central east–west route (decumanus maximus). However, as the main cardo ran up the western hill, and the Temple Mount blocked the eastward route of the main decumanus, the strict pattern had to be adapted to the local topography; a secondary, eastern cardo, diverged from the western one and ran down the Tyropoeon Valley, while the decumanus had to zigzag around the Temple Mount, passing it on its northern side. The Hadrianic western cardo terminated not far beyond its junction with the decumanus, where it reached the Roman garrison's encampment, but in the Byzantine period it was extended over the former camp to reach the southern, expanded margins of the city.

The two cardines converged near the Damascus Gate, and a semicircular piazza covered the remaining space; in the piazza a columnar monument was constructed, hence the Arabic name for the gate - Bab el-Amud (Gate of the Column).  Tetrapylones were constructed at the other junctions between the main roads.

This street pattern has been preserved in the Old City of Jerusalem to the present. The substantial remains of the western cardo have now been exposed to view near the junction with Suq el-Bazaar, and remnants of one of the tetrapylones are preserved in the 19th century Franciscan chapel at the junction of the Via Dolorosa and Suq Khan ez-Zeit.

Western forum
As was standard for new Roman cities, Hadrian placed the city's main forum at the junction of the main cardo and decumanus, now the location for the (smaller) Muristan. Adjacent to the forum, Hadrian built a large temple to Venus, at a site later used for the construction of the Church of the Holy Sepulchre; several boundary walls of Hadrian's temple have been found among the archaeological remains beneath the church.

Valley cardo and eastern forum
The Struthion Pool lay in the path of the northern decumanus, so Hadrian placed vaulting over it, added a large pavement on top, and turned it into a secondary forum; the pavement can still be seen under the Convent of the Sisters of Zion.

Ecce homo arch
Near the Struthion Pool, Hadrian built a triple-arched gateway as an entrance to the eastern forum of Aelia Capitolina. Traditionally, this was thought to be the gate of Herod's Antonia Fortress, which itself was alleged to be the location of Jesus' trial and Pontius Pilate's Ecce homo speech as described in John 19:13. This was due in part to the 1864 discovery of a game etched on a flagstone of the pool. According to the nuns of the convent, the game was played by Roman soldiers and ended in the execution of a 'monk king'. It is possible that following its destruction, the Antonia Fortress's pavement tiles were brought to the cistern of Hadrian's plaza.

When later constructions narrowed the Via Dolorosa, the two arches on either side of the central arch became incorporated into a succession of more modern buildings. The Basilica of Ecce Homo now preserves the northern arch. The southern arch was incorporated into a monastery for Uzbek dervishes belonging to the Order of the Golden Chain in the 16th century, but these were demolished in the 19th century in order to found a mosque.

See also

Alexander of Jerusalem (died 251), bishop of Jerusalem
Caesarea Maritima, Roman provincial capital after 6 CE
Gabbatha, biblical name of the place where Jesus was tried by Pilate
Names of Jerusalem

Further reading
 Leo Kadman, The Coins of Aelia Capitolina, Jerusalem, 1956
 Benjamin H. Isaac, Roman Colonies in Judaea: the Foundation of Aelia Capitolina, Talanta XII/XIII (1980/81),pp. 31–54
 Ritti, T., Documenti adrianei da Hierapolis di Frigia: le epistole di Adriano alla città, L’Hellénisme d’époque romaine. Nouveaux documents, nouvelles approches (ier s. a.C.–iiie s. p.C.), Paris, 2014, pp. 297–340
 Yaron Z. Eliav, The Urban Layout of Aelia Capitolina: A New View from the Perspective of the Temple Mount, The Bar Kokhba war reconsidered: new perspectives on the second Jewish Revolt, Peter Schäfer (ed.), 2003, pp. 241–277
 Zissu, B., Klein, E., Kloner, A. Settlement Processes in the territorium of Roman Jerusalem (Aelia Capitolina), J. M. Alvarez, T. Nogales, I. Roda (hg.), XVIII CIAC: Centre and Periphery in the Ancient World, Mérida, 2014, pp. 219–223.
 S. Weksler-Bdolah, The Foundation of Aelia Capitolina in Light of New Excavations along the Eastern Cardo, IEJ 64, 2014, pp. 38–62
 B. Isaac,Caesarea-on-the-Sea and Aelia Capitolina: Two Ambiguous Roman Colonies, L’héritage Grec des colonies Romaines d’Orient. Interactions culturelles dans les provinces hellénophones de l’empire romain, C. Brélaz (hg.), Paris, 2017, pp. 331–343.
 Kloner, A., Klein, E., Zissu, B., The Rural Hinterland (territorium) of Aelia Capitolina, G. Avni, G. D. Stiebel (hg.), Roman Jerusalem: A New Old City, Portsmouth, RI, 2017, pp. 131–141.
 Newman, H. I., The Temple Mount of Jerusalem and the Capitolium of Aelia Capitolina, Knowledge and Wisdom: Archaeological and Historical Essays in Honour of Leah Di Segni, G. C. Bottini, L. D. Chrupcała, J. Patrich (hg.), Jerusalem, 2017, pp. 35–42
 A. Bernini, Un riconoscimento di debito redatto a Colonia Aelia Capitolina, Zeitschrift für Papyrologie und Epigraphik 206, 2018, pp. 183–193
 A. Bernini, New Evidence for Colonia Aelia Capitolina (P. Mich. VII 445 + inv. 3888c + inv. 3944k, Proceedings of the 28th International Congress of Papyrology, Barcelona, 2019, pp. 557–562.
 Werner Eck, Die Colonia Aelia Capitolina: Überlegungen zur Anfangsphase der zweiten römischen Kolonie in der Provinz Iudaea-Syria Palaestina, ELECTRUM, Vol. 26 (2019), pp. 129–139
 Miriam Ben Zeev Hofman, Eusebius and Hadrian’s Founding of Aelia Capitolina in Jerusalem, ELECTRUM, Vol. 26 (2019), pp. 119–128
 Shlomit Weksler-Bdolah, Aelia Capitolina – Jerusalem in the Roman Period - In Light of Archaeological Research, Mnemosyne, Supplements, History and Archaeology of Classical Antiquity, Volume: 432, Brill, 2020

References
Footnotes

Citations

External links
 Detailed description (including map) of the city of Aelia Capitolina
 Pictures of the cave where it is believed by Christians that Jesus was buried and from which it is believed he resurrected and a picture of the remains of the walls of the Temple of Venus previously constructed on that site by the emperor Hadrian
 "Archaeologists bringing Jerusalem's ancient Roman city back to life"  by Nir Hasson, Ha'aretz, February 21, 2012
Photos of the Ecco Homo Arch at the Manar al-Athar photo archive

Jews and Judaism in the Roman Empire
Classical sites in Jerusalem
Former populated places in Southwest Asia
Ancient history of Jerusalem
Judea (Roman province)
Nerva–Antonine dynasty
Populated places established in the 2nd century
131 establishments
130s establishments in the Roman Empire
320s disestablishments in the Roman Empire
Roman towns and cities in Israel
Coloniae (Roman)
State of Palestine in the Roman era
Old City (Jerusalem)